Mauro Gallegati (born 8 March 1958) is an Italian New-Keynesian economist, scholar of agent-based economics, and professor at Marche Polytechnic University in Ancona, Italy.

Biography
After having earned his PhD in economics in 1989 at Marche Polytechnic University with a thesis on financial fragility under the supervision of Hyman Minsky, Gallegati has held visiting positions, both as a scholar and as a professor at Washington University in St. Louis, University of Cambridge, Stanford University, Massachusetts Institute of Technology, Columbia University, Santa Fe Institute, Brookings Institution, University of Technology, Sydney, Kyoto University, and ETH Zurich.

He currently teaches advanced macroeconomics at Marche Polytechnic University, in the Faculty of Economics, with Giorgio Fuà. He has been the president of the ESHIA Society (economic science with heterogeneous interacting agents).

His research activity is mainly centred on complexity economics. Within this field of research, he has published scientific works with Bruce Greenwald, Joseph Stiglitz, and Domenico Delli Gatti.

With Joseph Stiglitz, Gallegati has developed a theory of asymmetric information with heterogeneous agents and its applications.

Gallegati is a member of the Institute for New Economic Thinking.

Books
 Mauro Gallegati, Vie di fuga, Editore Ogni Uomo è Tutti Gli Uomini, 2013. 
 Mauro Gallegati, Oltre la siepe, Chiarelettere, 2014.

References

Bibliography
 Interview of Mauro Gallegati and Laura Gardini (Harrisonburg, Virginia, 18 May 2008), in: John Barkley Rosser, Richard P. F. Holt, David C. Colander (a cura +di), European Economics at a Crossroads, Edward Elgar Publishing, 2010  (pp. 94–105)
 Mauro Gallegati, on Institute for New Economic Thinking
 Mauro Gallegati, on Università Politecnica delle Marche
 Roberto Bagnoli, Il prof che spiega l'economia secondo Grillo, Corriere della sera, 13 February 2013

New Keynesian economists
Italian economists
1958 births
Living people
Santa Fe Institute people